A series may refer to:

 ISO 216 A series, paper sizes defined by the ISO 216 standard, including A4 paper size
 A series and B series, two philosophical descriptions of the temporal ordering of events
 A-series light bulb, the most common type of light bulbs used since the early 20th century
 BMC A-Series engine, a small straight-4 automobile engine produced by the Austin Motor Company
 Canon PowerShot A, camera
 Fujifilm FinePix A series, camera series
 Honda A engine
 International A series, pickup truck
 QI (A series), the first series of the TV quiz show QI
 Samsung Galaxy A series, a line of mid-range smartphones
 Series A, venture capital financing round for startups
 Series A banknotes, Irish banknotes
 Tool steel A series, air hardened
 Transperth A-series train, a type of electric multiple unit used by Transperth Trains in Perth, Western Australia
 Sony Walkman A Series
 Sony Vaio A series laptops
 Toshiba Satellite A series laptops

See also
 A class (disambiguation)
 B series (disambiguation)
 Z series (disambiguation)
 0 series (disambiguation)